PASKAL: The Movie is a 2018 Malaysian Malay-language military action film directed by Adrian Teh and produced by Asia Tropical Films and Golden Screen Cinemas. It stars Hairul Azreen, Jasmine Suraya Chin, and Tiger Chen Hu. It was inspired by the elite Royal Malaysian Navy (RMN) force named PASKAL (Pasukan Khas Laut). With a budget of RM10 million (US$2.4 million), PASKAL: The Movie is the most expensive Malaysian film ever made.

Filming began in Kuala Lumpur from March to May 2018; its official premiere was on 27 September 2018. The film received positive critical reviews and it netted an overall profit of almost RM 30 million, making it one of the highest-grossing local films in Malaysia, following Munafik 2 and Hantu Kak Limah. In December 2018, PASKAL was listed by the local Malaysian newspaper Harian Metro as among the top 10 local films in Malaysian history.

Plot

In 2018, a supertanker, Laurel 11 (based on the real-life Bunga Laurel), was hijacked by Somali pirates at the Gulf of Aden one night. The Royal Malaysian Navy picks up the distress call and KA Bunga Mas Lima, which was bound for home after a long operation at sea, comes to aid. The pirate's refusal to negotiate prompted Commander Maznan to deploy the Navy's elite special operations unit, PASKAL, commanded by Lieutenant Commander Arman Rahmat. Two boats and a Super Lynx helicopter were deployed for the mission. Their swift and stealthy tactics ensured the eventual success of the operation with the pirates subdued and captured.

The team returns to Lumut with Arman thinking on whether to retire or not. His mother's apparent distaste with his dangerous job and the painful memory of his past had prompted him to do so. Back in 2009 when he was a sub-lieutenant, Arman had undergone training with a late friend, Joshua Tee Seng Wai (Girang), and Mohd Zariff bin Zafrudin (Jeb). His motivation to join PASKAL was to honour his father's sacrifice. The three of them were among the best in the unit and were selected to undergo advanced training course with the US Navy SEALs. However, during a peacekeeping operation in Angola two years later, Jeb accidentally killed Joshua in a confrontation with a rebel group while transporting a Chinese UN Observer. Wounded, he was dishonourably discharged after he brutally executed a prisoner with a sidearm. Arman told Joshua's wife, Lily about the incident and Joshua was given a military funeral.

Arman continues to take care of Joshua's wife and only son, who had also developed a close bond with his mother. Despite handling his request to retire, Commander Maznan enlists him on a reconnaissance mission in Kota Kinabalu as a "farewell party". However, the plan was foiled after Arman discovered Jeb at a food court with Rudi. It was learned that Rudi, through his successful raids, has been hiring ex-special forces members to his ranks, and Jeb was recruited as his bodyguard.

Jeb's jealousy over Arman's achievements and the apparent dislike with the Navy's system brings him at odds with Arman since training day and it only got worse when Jeb starts to stalk Lily, warning Arman to stay away. CCTV footage of Jeb's car showing a logo belonging to an oil rig company where Lily works alerted Arman to a possible hijacking plot. He alerts the Navy, who in turn alerted port authorities to lock down the area. The fake security personnel team was captured by authorities, but Jeb and Rudi managed to evade capture. They eventually seized the oil rig, with Lily being one of the hostages.

Two additional teams were deployed as back-up to a forward operating base aboard . After a change of plans, they dived towards the oil rig and secured the top to make way for reinforcements. As they fought past various traps and ambushes, Arman encounters Jeb with Lily bound to C-4 explosives. Jeb threatens to blow up the entire oil rig if Arman does not put his gun down. Arman complies, but Jeb threatens to kill Arman with a knife, challenging him to see who is the better PASKAL. After a fight, Arman managed to subdue Jeb and pushes him off the deck, still grabbed onto Jeb's hand. Refusing to be captured and accept that Arman had won, Jeb says that he's still the best and shoots Arman with his pistol. However, the bullet only scratches Arman's face. Arman was forced to let go and Jeb fell into the sea to his death. Rudi and another pirate attempt to escape by crossing the Filipino waters by boat but was pursued by a Navy vessel. Just before they can cross, they were shot dead. The boat eventually crossed the Filipino waters with their lifeless bodies on board.

With all the hostages rescued and brought to shore, Arman's mother, finally understanding her son's sacrifice, acknowledges him and apologises, saying that his father would be proud if he was alive. Arman and his team were awarded honours by the RMN commander. At one point, he laments about not knowing the full names of the members who he served with, in which chief petty officer Misi replies "How many kingdoms know nothing of us?", referencing the philosopher Blaise Pascal in his book Pensées. As the commander brings Arman to a memorial site where his father's name was inscribed, he reveals that Arman's father once served under him and told that his father's duty was a calling from God, in which it will be a sin if there's no one willing to do it.

Cast

Principal cast 

 Hairul Azreen as Lieutenant Commander Arman Rahmat / Jerung
 A born leader, Arman has the qualities of a true soldier. His late father once served under PASKAL with Commander Maznan and a subordinate of RMN commander. He is one of the best soldiers in his unit, earning him awards for his basic course.
 Ammar Alfian as Warrant Officer Class 1 Mohd Zariff bin Zafrudin / Jeb
 A stronger, muscular man who reaps rewards based on his skills. Jeb's erratic and aggressive behaviour was portrayed early in basic training and his jealousy of Arman grew stronger. In a mission in Angola in 2011, his aggressive nature surpassed his rationality, choosing to engage the enemy with a grenade that was tossed back by the enemy, which inevitably killed Joshua. Jeb was dishonourably discharged for killing a prisoner cold-blooded. He blamed the system for "unfairness" and went rogue. He worked as a mercenary for Rudi.
 Henley Hii as Lieutenant Joshua Tee Seng Wai / Girang: Joshua is one of Arman's closest friends and a Chinese-Malaysian PASKAL commando. He is married to Lily and had a son. He was unintentionally killed by Jeb during a confrontation in Angola.
 Taufiq Hanafi as Lieutenant Khairil Fikri bin Abdul Musa / Ustad: Ustad served as Arman's second in-command and follows the teachings of Islam to heart.
 Gambit Saifullah as Petty Officer (Bintara Muda) Adam Ashraf bin Hanafi / Gagak: Gagak served as the team's designated marksman.
 Hafizul Kamal as Petty Officer (Bintara Muda) Imran Tamrin bin Radzi / Yan
 Theebaan G as Chief Petty Officer (Bintara Kanan) Shailesh Marimuthu / Misi: An officer who spends his time reading books.
Jasmine Suraya Chin as Lily, Joshua's wife.
 Nam Ron as Commander Maznan
 Sherry Aljeffri as Khadijah
 Amerul Affendi as Rudi Rusli Parjo, a pirate leader involved in the hijacking of MT Orkim Harmony
 Dato' Sri Eizlan Yusof as RMN commander
 Sam Loo as Zero, a Chinese-Malaysian PASKAL commando on Arman's team
 Lucas Chua as Polar / Bravo One, a Chinese-Malaysian PASKAL commando on Arman's team
 Adi Afendi as Captain Michael of Bunga Laurel II supertanker

Cameo/Special appearances 

 Tiger Chen as Sergeant Chen Han, a UN Mainland China Observer in Angola rescued by Arman's team
Lieutenant Commander Jason Solomon as Super Lynx pilot (himself)
Steven Yap as Boon, an engineer on the "Bunga Laurel"
Adrian Teh as Captain Stanley, commanding officer of the KD Selangor
Keoh Chee Ang as Security guard
Lieutenant Commander Noor Asri Roslan as Assistant aide of RMN commander (himself) and in real life he involved Operation Fajar
Fabian Loo as Wai, Jasmine's friend and co-worker on the oil rig

Production
PASKAL was directed by Adrian Teh. It is based on actual events of the Royal Malaysian Navy's Special Forces Team during the United Nations peacekeeping mission in Angola in 1998, and the successful rescue of the hijacked MV Bunga Laurel trade vessel in 2011. The cost of filming was about RM10 million. The shooting was conducted at several locations within and outside of Malaysia, including Lumut, Semporna, and Istanbul, Turkey.

References

External links
 
 

2018 films
Malaysian action films
Malay-language films
Films about navies
Films about special forces